Yimi García (born August 18, 1990) is a Dominican professional baseball pitcher for the Toronto Blue Jays of Major League Baseball (MLB). He previously played in MLB for the Los Angeles Dodgers, Miami Marlins and Houston Astros. He signed with the Dodgers as an amateur free agent in 2009 and made his MLB debut in 2014.

Professional career

Los Angeles Dodgers
García signed with the Los Angeles Dodgers as an amateur free agent in 2009 and spent one season with the Dominican Summer League Dodgers before joining the domestic leagues with the Arizona League Dodgers in 2010 and Ogden Raptors in 2011. In 2012, he had a 3.02 earned run average (ERA)) in 40 games with the Great Lakes Loons, with 14 saves. In a late season promotion to the Rancho Cucamonga Quakes he had a 2.53 ERA in nine games. In 2013, he had a 4–6 win–loss record with a 2.54 ERA and 19 saves in 49 games with the AA Chattanooga Lookouts.

The Dodgers added García to their 40-man roster on November 20, 2013, and promoted him to the AAA Albuquerque Isotopes. In 47 games for the Isotopes, he was 4–2 with a 3.10 ERA. He was called up to the Dodgers on September 1, 2014. He made his debut that night, in the eighth inning, against the Washington Nationals. He gave up a hit to the first batter he faced, Bryce Harper, and logged his first strikeout in the Major Leagues, working 2 innings and not giving up any runs. He pitched in eight games for the Dodgers, allowing only two earned runs in 10 innings. He also struck out nine batters while walking only one. Both of the runs he allowed were on solo homers (by Brandon Barnes and Michael McKenry, both of the Rockies).

In 2015, García appeared in 59 games for the Dodgers (and also made one start) and was 3–5 with a 3.34 ERA. He appeared in just nine games the following season,  pitching 8  innings with a 3.24 ERA. He was shutdown on April 22 with right biceps soreness and experienced a setback on his rehab assignment on July 29, ending his season. He underwent arthroscopic surgery on his left knee in September and then on October 25 he underwent Tommy John surgery. Despite missing the entire 2017 season, the Dodgers signed him to a $630,000 one-year contract for 2018, to avoid salary arbitration.

Garcia returned to the majors on May 3, 2018. The following day, against the San Diego Padres at Estadio de Béisbol Monterrey, he pitched a scoreless eighth inning and was one of four pitchers involved in a combined no-hitter as the Dodgers won 4–0. He pitched in 25 games in 2018, with a 5.64 ERA. The following year, he improved his numbers and as a result saw his usage rise. He appeared in 64 games for the Dodgers in 2019, with a 3.61 ERA and 66 strikeouts.

On December 2, 2019, García was non-tendered and became a free agent.

Miami Marlins
On December 20, 2019, García signed a one-year contract with the Miami Marlins. He pitched 15 innings in 14 appearances for the Marlins in 2020, striking out 19, for an ERA of 0.60. García posted a 3.47 ERA and struck out 35 over 39 games, in  innings, for the Marlins in 2021.

Houston Astros
On July 28, 2021, Garcia was traded from the Marlins to the Astros in exchange for minor league outfielder Bryan De La Cruz and pitcher Austin Pruitt.

With Houston in 2021, García was 1–2 with a 5.48 ERA. In 23 relief appearances he pitched  innings, striking out 25 batters.  On November 3, 2021, García was declared a free agent.

Toronto Blue Jays
On December 1, 2021, García signed a two-year, $11 million contract with the Toronto Blue Jays.

See also

 List of Los Angeles Dodgers no-hitters
 List of Major League Baseball no-hitters
 List of Major League Baseball players from the Dominican Republic

References

External links

1990 births
Living people
Albuquerque Isotopes players
Arizona League Dodgers players
Buffalo Bisons (minor league) players
Chattanooga Lookouts players
Dominican Republic expatriate baseball players in the United States
Dominican Summer League Dodgers players
Glendale Desert Dogs players
Great Lakes Loons players
Houston Astros players
Los Angeles Dodgers players
Major League Baseball pitchers
Major League Baseball players from the Dominican Republic
Miami Marlins players
Ogden Raptors players
Oklahoma City Dodgers players
People from Espaillat Province
Rancho Cucamonga Quakes players
Toronto Blue Jays players
Tulsa Drillers players
2023 World Baseball Classic players